St. Joseph's English-medium Higher Secondary School, Sulthan Bathery is a private coeducational Malankara Catholic  educational institution located in Sultan Bathery, Wayanad district, Kerala. Established and administered by the Bishop of Bathery, it is the First Certified English school in Wayanad.

St. Joseph's School was established in 1977 as a private tuition centre. It was elevated as a Recognised English School with a lower primary section in 1980, and again in 1984 with the addition of upper primary and high school divisions, and 2002 with the addition of a higher secondary school. Admission is open to all students according to availability irrespective of their caste, creed or religion and each one's religious freedom is respected. Bishop Joseph Mar Thomas is the manager and patron of the school, and Msgrs. Mathew Arambankudy and Thomas Kanjiramukalil are its co-patrons.

References

Catholic secondary schools in India
Premonstratensian Order
Christian schools in Kerala
High schools and secondary schools in Kerala
Schools in Wayanad district
Educational institutions established in 1977
1977 establishments in Kerala